Ülo Tulik (11 May 1957 – 30 April 2022) was an Estonian agronomist and politician. Tulik was born in Meremäe on 11 May 1957. He was the Võru County Governor from 2005 until 2010 and Mayor of Võru from 2010 until 2011, as well as a member of XII Riigikogu.

References

1957 births
2022 deaths
Estonian agronomists
Isamaa politicians
Estonian Centre Party politicians
Members of the Riigikogu, 2011–2015
Mayors of places in Estonia
Estonian University of Life Sciences alumni
People from Setomaa Parish